Girls Without Tomorrow 1992 (應召女郎1988之二現代應召女郎) is a 1992 Hong Kong film directed by David Lam Tak Luk and Wong Chi. Carina Lau, Fung Bo-Bo, May Lo Mei-Mei, Vivian Chow and Pauline Chan act as five prostitutes in the story. It is a sequel to the 1988 film Girls Without Tomorrow.

Plot
Hung is a prostitute of Hong Kong Temple Street. Her daughter, TV actress Siu Ling  refuses to acknowledge her. However, Siu Ling's road to stardom made her betraying her body. Hung's foster daughter, Wah is a hot-tempered dancing girl in a night club, she always fought with clients and colleague and got herself in tough situations. Eva is the glamorous top model escort. Yuk become a call girl to fulfill her dream of studying abroad. They surrounded with fame and glory, middle class status, or just no status.

Cast and roles
 Pauline Chan – Eva
 Ekin Cheng – Onn (credited as Dior Cheng)
 John Ching – Big Fly
 Andy Hui – Ling-Yuk's New Pimp
 Vivian Chow – Fong Siu-Ling
 Michael Dingo – Wang
 Fung Bo-Bo – Hung
 Rutherford John – Western Businessman 2
 Carina Lau – Wa
 Lau Siu-Ming – Li
 Mike Leeder – Western businessman
 Alan Chui Chung-San - Brother Two 
 Waise Lee – Peter
 May Lo Mei-Mei – Yuen Ling-Yuk
 Shum Wai – Simon
 Yee Fn Wei – Drunk Actor
 Yung Sai-Kit – Man with Eye Trouble

Box office
The film grossed HK$8,844,721 at the Hong Kong box office during its theatrical run from 30 July to 19 August 1992 in Hong Kong.

Blu-ray reprint
This film was first released on Blu-ray Disc on March 20, 2020.

See also
 Prostitution in Hong Kong

References

External links
 
 
 Girls Without Tomorrow 2 (1992) at Hong Kong Cinemagic
 Girls Without Tomorrow 1992 in Hong Kong Film Archive

Hong Kong drama films
1992 films
Films directed by David Lam
Hong Kong sequel films
1990s Hong Kong films